Charlotte Speedway was the site of NASCAR's first Strictly Stock Series (now NASCAR Cup Series) race on June 19, 1949. The Daytona Beach Road Course held the first race sanctioned by NASCAR in 1948. The track was a few miles west of the NASCAR Hall of Fame, on Little Rock Road. It was owned by Carl C. Allison Sr. and his wife, Catherine Montgomery Allison. The track was forced to close when construction of Interstate 85 took its parking area.

Event details
Charlotte Speedway was a three-quarter mile long dirt track. The first event in 1949 was a  race.

NASCAR history
Twelve events were held at the track between 1949 and 1956. Winners at the track include: Jim Roper (1), Tim Flock (1), Curtis Turner (2), Herb Thomas (2), Dick Passwater (1), Buck Baker (3), Fonty Flock (1), and Speedy Thompson (1).

1949

Bob Flock won the pole. Glenn Dunaway was declared the original winner, but a post-race inspection revealed that his car was fitted with illegal springs, causing NASCAR to disqualify him. Jim Roper was declared the official winner of the event. Roper would only compete in one more NASCAR event in his career. Other famous drivers to finish in the Top 10 include: Fonty Flock, Red Byron, Tim Flock, and Curtis Turner. Famous drivers to finish outside of the Top 10 include: Buck Baker, Jack Smith, Lee Petty, Herb Thomas, and Bob Flock. Sara Christian finished 14th to become the first female to start in a NASCAR race.

External links
Track history and details at racing-reference.info

Sports venues in Charlotte, North Carolina
NASCAR tracks
Motorsport venues in North Carolina
Defunct sports venues in North Carolina
1949 establishments in North Carolina
1956 disestablishments in North Carolina
Sports venues completed in 1949